Henryk Szymborski (18 January 1931 – 30 August 2008) was a Polish footballer. He played in six matches for the Poland national football team from 1951 to 1958.

References

External links
 

1931 births
2008 deaths
Polish footballers
Poland international footballers
Place of birth missing
Association footballers not categorized by position